The blue-throated motmot (Aspatha gularis) is a species of bird in the family Momotidae. It is found in El Salvador, Guatemala, Honduras, and Mexico.

Taxonomy and systematics

The blue-throated motmot is monotypic. It apparently has no close relatives.

Description

It has a long, graduated, tail that in contrast to that of most other motmots does not have racquet tips. The side of the adult's head is ochre with a black "ear" spot. It is mostly green above and paler green below. The throat is blue with a black spot just below it. The juvenile is duller and the green of the back is washed with olive.

Distribution and habitat

The blue-throated motmot is found from Oaxaca and Chiapas in Mexico south and east through Guatemala and a bit of El Salvador to Honduras. It inhabits  montane evergreen and pine forest of medium to high humidity.

Behavior

Feeding
The blue-throated motmot forages by plucking insects, especially beetles, from foliage while flying. It also eats some fruit and apparently feeds fruit to nestlings.

Breeding

In Guatemala it lays eggs in April, and a fledgling was collected in late May in Mexico. The clutch size is three.

Vocalization

The blue-throated motmot typically calls from a high exposed perch. It usually gives single "hoot" or "huuk" notes  but sometimes strings them together as "hoodloodloodloodl..." .

Status

The IUCN has assessed the blue-throated motmot as being of Least Concern. Though its population appears to be decreasing, its population and range are large enough to achieve that rating

References

External links
Image at ADW

blue-throated motmot
Birds of Mexico
Birds of Guatemala
Birds of Honduras
blue-throated motmot
Taxonomy articles created by Polbot